Andarun-e Bid Anjir (also Romanized as Andarūn-e Bīd Ānjīr; also known as Andarūn) is a village in Poshteh-ye Zilayi Rural District, Sarfaryab District, Charam County, Kohgiluyeh and Boyer-Ahmad Province, Iran. At the 2006 census, its population was 133, in 20 families.

References 

Populated places in Charam County